Daydream is the fifth studio album by American jazz singer Karrin Allyson. The album was released on August 19, 1997 by Concord Jazz label. The recording locations were: Soundtrek Studios in Kansas City, Sound on Sound Studios in NYC, and A Wing & A Prayer Productions in Central Point, Oregon.

Reception
In his review for AllMusic, Scott Yanow commented, "Karrin Allyson has a beautiful voice that is also quite flexible, as she shows throughout this consistently interesting release. The emphasis is a little more on ballads than usual, but there are some heated moments too."All About Jazz review stated, "This excellent CD reminds us that Allyson isn't just a pop singer with some jazz influence—she's a improvising, hard swinging jazzer who can blow with the spontaneity of a saxophonist. And if you doubt it, just check out how passionately and freely she swings on everything..."

Track listing

References

1997 albums
Karrin Allyson albums